John R. Jasinski (born June 24, 1966) is an American politician and member of the Minnesota Senate. A member of the Republican Party of Minnesota, he represents Minnesota's 19th Senate District in southeastern Minnesota.

Early life, education, and career
Jasinski was born on June 24, 1966, and raised in Faribault. He graduated from Faribault High School and attended the University of Minnesota Duluth and Minnesota State University, Mankato.

Jasinski was in the Navy for four years. He was previously a member of the Faribault Planning Commission, the Faribault Economic Development Authority, and, from 1996 to 1998, the Faribault City Council. Jasinski was the mayor of Faribault from 2008 to 2016 and is a real estate broker at MDC Real Estate Services in Faribault.

Minnesota Senate
Jasinski was elected to the Minnesota Senate in 2016.

Personal life
Jasinski is divorced and has two children. He resides in Faribault.

In October 2020, Jasinski was arrested for driving while impaired; he subsequently pleaded guilty to misdemeanor careless driving and was given a year of probation with mandatory treatment for chemical dependency.

References

External links

 Official Senate website
 Official campaign website

1966 births
Living people
People from Faribault, Minnesota
Minnesota State University, Mankato alumni
Minnesota city council members
Mayors of places in Minnesota
Republican Party Minnesota state senators
21st-century American politicians